Xu Yan may refer to:

 Xu Yan 徐彦 (Tang dynasty), purported author of the sub-commentary to the Gongyang Zhuan
Xu Yan (judoka) (born 1981), Chinese female judoka
Xu Yan (kickboxer) (born 1987), Chinese male kickboxer
Xu Yan (table tennis), Singaporean female table tennis player
 Xu Hong Yan, paralympic athlete from China competing mainly in shot put and discus